A constitutional referendum was held in Somalia on 20 June 1961 to vote on the new constitution for the country created the previous year by the union of British Somaliland and Italian Somaliland. It was approved by 90.56% of voters.

In the territory of former British Somaliland, the Somali National League (SNL) party encouraged a boycott of the referendum, and 60% of the approximately 100,000 votes from the area opposed the constitution. However the south of the country had 1,952,660 voters, effectively giving the south the power of veto, and obfuscated the fact there was no popular mandate for a union.

Electoral Fraud
More votes were cast in Wanlaweyn, a small town in southern Somalia, than in the entirety of Somaliland. This created a climate of distrust and a new term for southerners – Wanla Weyn.

Results

References

1961 in Somalia
Somalia
Referendums in Somalia
Constitutional referendums
June 1961 events in Africa